North Columbus may refer to:

 North Columbus, Georgia
 North Columbus, Indiana